The Ivory Key is a 2022 young adult fantasy novel by Indian American writer Akshaya Raman. Raman's debut novel inspired by Indian culture and mythology was published on 4 January 2022 by HarperCollins as the first book in a planned duology and follows four siblings as the embark on a journey to find the Ivory Key, a magical artefact capable of providing magic.

Plot

Set in the Indian inspired world of Ashoka, magic is an essential physical resource mined in quarry sites and the biggest export and it is the only thing that can save them from a war with the neighboring kingdoms as long as the kingdoms are unaware of the depletion of magic.

After the Maharani is assassinated, her four children; Vira, Ronak, Kaleb and Riya will have to work together to find the ivory key to unlock a new source of magic although each of them has their own personal goals.

Vira wishes to use the key to continue the legacy of her mother, the Maharani, Ronak plans to sell the key to the highest bidder, Kaleb wants to use it to prove his innocence after being accused of killing the Maharani and Riya needs it to show her loyalty to the Ravens, a group of rebels. The four siblings will have to work together or else they would lose everything they worked hard for.

Reception
The book was ranked as one of the most anticipated book of January 2022 by several magazines and literary websites including Polygon, PopSugar,  Book Riot, BuzzFeed and Tor.com. It received several positive receptions from reviewers. A starred review from Kirkus Reviews notes that the novel "Skillfully weaves together political intrigue, complex sibling relationships, and magic". Another starred review from Publishers Weekly states that it "remains largely solid, as does the richly described worldbuilding, tight plot, and moderate doses of romance, making for a complex and layered narrative".

Booklist praised the novel, writing that "Raman’s Indian-inspired fantasy debut is a dream for seekers of character-driven stories…Slow-burning romance, BIPOC and queer representation, family drama, and a country under threat of war—the first in Raman’s duology does not disappoint" and also The Guardian called it the "Book one of an epic fantasy duology layered with Indian folklore and traditions, Raman’s YA debut deals intriguingly with ideas of power, belonging and temptation".

References 

Indian fantasy novels
American fantasy novels
2022 fantasy novels
2022 American novels
American young adult novels
Young adult fantasy novels
Novels set in India
HarperCollins books